Zevulun Regional Council (Mo'atza Azorit Zvulun) is a regional council in the Haifa District of Israel. Founded in 1950, it had a population of 10,900 in 2006.

The council borders Mateh Asher Regional Council to the north, Jezreel Valley Regional Council and Shefa-'Amr to the east, Carmel Nature Reserve national park and Kiryat Tiv'on to the south and HaKerayot to the west.

Name
The name  is derived from the Hebrew name "Emek Zevulun", lit. "Zebulun Valley", given by Zionist pioneers to the coastal area stretching along the Bay of Acre, from Acre (Akko) to Haifa, on the incorrect assumption that the tribe of Zebulun once had its territory in this area – this land was part of the allotment of Asher, and is a coastal plain, not a valley.

List of communities

Kibbutzim
Kfar HaMaccabi
Ramat Yohanan
Sha'ar HaAmakim
Usha
Yagur

Moshavim
Kfar Bialik
Kfar Hasidim Alef

Communal settlements
Kfar Hasidim Bet
Nofit

Arab villages
Ibtin
Khawaled
Ras Ali

Other villages
Kfar HaNoar HaDati
Oranim

External links
Official website 

 
Regional councils in Israel
Regional councils in Haifa District